Online gaming may refer to:

 Online game, a game played over a computer network
 Online gambling, gambling using the Internet

See also 
 Gamble (disambiguation)
 Game (disambiguation)
 Gamer, a person who plays games, especially video games
 Gaming (disambiguation)